Harold Buttleman, Daredevil Stuntman (also known as Buttleman) is a 2003 film written and directed by Francis Stokes; the only movie he has directed. It won the Jury Prize at the Deep Ellum Film Festival in 2003.  It was awarded the audience award in the Had to Be Made Film Festival in 2005.

The film is a comedy about a small town tuxedo salesman who thinks he's the next Evel Knievel, a renowned American stunt man. It stars John Hawkes as Harold Buttleman, and co-stars Karen Black and Dan Castellaneta.

This film features music from Splitsville's album The Complete Pet Soul.

External links

2003 films
American independent films
2003 comedy films
American comedy films
2003 directorial debut films
2000s English-language films
2000s American films